Leigh Sherer Seirafi (born August 29, 1973) is an American beauty pageant titleholder from Jasper, Alabama, who was named Miss Alabama 1995. She was a top ten finalist for Miss America 1996.

Pageant career
While a freshman at Samford University, Sherer was crowned Miss Samford 1992 and competed for the 1992 Miss Alabama title. Sherer earned the Miss Cullman Area 1993 title and competed in the 1993 Miss Alabama pageant. She was named second runner-up to winner Kalyn Chapman. In July 1993, Sherer won the Miss Point Mallard title, earning her a spot in the 1994 Miss Alabama pageant held in June 1994.

Sherer was crowned Miss Walker County 1995 which made her eligible to compete at the 1995 Miss Alabama pageant. Entering the state pageant in June 1995 as one of  finalists, Sherer's preliminary competition talent for Miss Alabama a combined piano and vocal performance. She won her group's preliminary talent competition. Sherer won the competition on Saturday, June 17, 1995, when she received her crown from outgoing Miss Alabama titleholder Amie Beth Dickinson. As Miss Alabama, her activities included public appearances across the state of Alabama, including hosting duties at regional pageants and convention appearances.

Sherer was Alabama's representative at the Miss America 1996 pageant in Atlantic City, New Jersey, in September 1995. Her competition talent was a combination of a piano performance of a medley of songs from Carmen and a vocal solo performance of the "Habanera" aria from the same opera. She was a top ten finalist for the national title.

Her reign as Miss Alabama continued until Alison McCreary was crowned on June 15, 1996.

Personal life and education
Sherer is a native of Jasper, Alabama, and graduated from Walker High School in 1991. The Alabama Public Housing Authority honored Sherer as their 1995 Volunteer of the Year.

Sherer earned a bachelor's degree with a double major in piano and vocal performance from Samford University in 1997. She was the first student to earn a full piano scholarship from Samford and won the Concerto Aria piano competition in 1994 and 1995. Sherer was inducted into the Kappa chapter of Alpha Delta Pi sorority while at Samford.

She married Peter Seirafi. They have two sons, Peter and Nicholas, and reside in Columbus, Georgia.

References

External links

Miss Alabama official website

1973 births
Living people
American beauty pageant winners
Miss Alabama winners
Miss America 1996 delegates
People from Jasper, Alabama
Samford University alumni
University of Northern Colorado alumni
20th-century American people